Thomas James Irwin (21 June 1889 – 15 May 1962) was a Canadian politician serving in the Legislative Assembly of British Columbia and the House of Commons of Canada.

Irwin was born in Dumbarton, Scotland and became a farmer by trade. He was elected to the BC legislature in the 1952 provincial election at the Delta electoral district as a provincial Social Credit candidate. He was re-elected there for two more terms following the 1953 and 1956 provincial elections. From 1953 to 1957, he served as Speaker of the Assembly.

He was first elected at the Burnaby—Richmond riding in the 1957 general election as a Social Credit party member of Parliament. He served only one term there, the 23rd Canadian Parliament, after which he was defeated by John Drysdale of the Progressive Conservative party in the 1958 election.

External links
 

1889 births
1962 deaths
People from Dumbarton
Scottish emigrants to Canada
Members of the House of Commons of Canada from British Columbia
Social Credit Party of Canada MPs
Canadian farmers
British Columbia Social Credit Party MLAs